Matters is an album by the punk rock band Pulley. It was released on April 6, 2004, via Epitaph Records.

Track listing
  "A Bad Reputation"  – 2:54
  "Blindfold"  – 2:43
  "Huber Breeze"  – 2:25
  "Insects Destroy"  – 3:20
  "Looking Back"  – 2:48
  "Poltergeist"  – 2:16
  "Immune"  – 4:24
  "YSC"  – 3:09
  "Stomach Aches"  – 2:51
  "I Remember"  – 2:20
  "Suitcase"  – 3:13
  "Thanks"  – 1:12

 Track 7 is two songs. "Immune" ends at 3:24. At the 3:26 mark begins a cover of the theme song to the 1970s children's television show Land of the Lost.
 In Track 8 the sound clip at 2:12-2:32 is from the song "The Master's Call," by Marty Robbins

References

Pulley (band) albums
2004 albums